Theopompa is an Asian genus of praying mantids: in the subfamily Gonypetinae.

Species
The Mantodea Species File lists:
 Theopompa borneana Giglio-Tos, 1917
 Theopompa burmeisteri Haan, 1842
 Theopompa ophthalmica Olivier, 1792
 Theopompa schulzeorum Schwarz, 2021
 Theopompa servillei de Haan, 1842 - type species
 Theopompa tosta Stal, 1877

References

External links

Mantodea genera